Máximo Othón Zayas (born 15 May 1971) is a Mexican politician affiliated with the PAN. He currently serves as Deputy of the LXII Legislature of the Mexican Congress representing Sonora.

Controversies 
In August 2014, Reporte Indigo published online a video of several PAN Deputies, among them Othón Zayas in a party with exotic dancers in a luxury compound in Jalisco. The General Secretary of the PAN in Sonora said it's impossible to sanction Othón Zayas for events related to his private life.

References

1971 births
Living people
People from Navojoa
Politicians from Sonora
National Action Party (Mexico) politicians
21st-century Mexican politicians
Members of the Chamber of Deputies (Mexico) for Sonora